Krishna Bhagavan, (born 2 July 1965) is an actor in Tollywood, who has appeared in more than 350 films, mostly as a comedian. He is also well known as a writer.

Early life
Krishna Bhagavan was born Meenavalli Paparao Chowdary in Kaikavolu, a small village in the East Godavari District to Meenavalli LakshmiKantham, Veerraju. He spent his childhood in Kaikavolu and went to Pedapudi to study at Gandhi Memorial School there. He used to cross the farms and a small canal to go to his school.

Personal life
Krishna Bhagavan married Lakshmi and has 1 Daughter.

Career
He was very interested in acting since childhood and acted in school plays. His first professional drama was Pending File, in which he played the role of Parandhamayya but, as he went on the stage, he forgot his lines completely. It was a memorable experience for him as a drama artiste.

He then went to Chennai to start his film career. He did a screen test for Kranti Kumar, where he was one among 300 people. He got an opportunity to act in that film but the producer's death halted the project.

After that he did Maharshi, for Sravanthi Ravi Kishore, along with Raghava, Nishanti and Ram Jagan. It was directed by Vamsy.

He then appeared in April 1st Vidudala, which was directed by Vamsy. He has done the script work for few movies including Detective Narada.

His career as an actor languished until he performed the role of Babji in the television serial Vasantha Kokila, directed by Uppalapati Narayana Rao, which won him the Andhra Pradesh State Nandi Award. Afterward, he acted in the movies Avunu Valliddaru Ista Paddaru! and Kabaddi Kabaddi.

After becoming a popular comedian, Krishna Bhagavan got offers as solo lead and acted in John Appa Rao 40 Plus, Donga Sachinollu, Mr. Girisham, Andhra Andagadu, and Bommana Brothers Chandana Sisters.

Filmography

Telugu

References

External links
 
 https://youtube/Qs4yUMBe8XY
 https://www.youtube.com/#krishnabhagavanlatest
 https://www.youtube.com/watch?v=zM_lzsUQ9V0
 A brief history of Krishna Bhagavan
 Hin

1965 births
Living people
Male actors from Andhra Pradesh
Male actors in Telugu cinema
Indian male film actors
Telugu comedians
Indian male comedians
20th-century Indian male actors
21st-century Indian male actors
People from East Godavari district